Clark is a township in southern Union County, New Jersey, United States. As of the 2020 United States census, the township's population was 15,544, an increase of 788 (+5.3%) from the 2010 census count of 14,756, which in turn reflected an increase of 159 (+1.1%) from the 14,597 counted in the 2000 census.

History

The territory that would become Clark was originally a part of several early settlements. The Robinson Plantation House and The Squire Hartshorne House, buildings from the late 17th century, are remnants of the era. The Homestead Farm at Oak Ridge was the site of a skirmish preceding the Battle of Short Hills. In 1858, after the City of Rahway was incorporated, the area of present-day Clark was designated as the 5th Ward of Rahway. Clark was incorporated as a township by an act of the New Jersey Legislature on March 23, 1864, from portions of Rahway. The township was named for Abraham Clark, a signer of the Declaration of Independence. Portions of the township were taken to form Cranford Township (March 14, 1871) and Winfield Township (August 6, 1941).

New Jersey Monthly magazine ranked Clark as its 33rd best place to live in its 2008 rankings of the "Best Places To Live" in New Jersey. In 2013, New Jersey Monthly magazine ranked Clark 174th in its rankings of "Best Places To Live" in New Jersey.

In July 2020, the Union County Prosecutor's Office opened an investigation into the Clark township police department and put the police chief and a captain on administrative leave after allegations of misconduct.

In March 2022, NJ Advance Media, a local newspaper, revealed a recording of Mayor Sal Bonaccorso using racial slurs when talking to members of the police department, despite him having previously denied doing so, and also saying women police officers were "disasters". The newspaper also reported that in January 2020, Clark Township had paid Clark police lieutenant Antonio Manata $400,000 to not reveal racist and sexist comments made by the Mayor and Chief of Police and to turn over the tapes he had recorded. On April 5, Bonaccorso admitted to using "hurtful and insensitive language" and apologized. The New Jersey Office of Public Integrity and Accountability subsequently took control of the Union County investigation.

Geography
According to the United States Census Bureau, the township had a total area of 4.45 square miles (11.53 km2), including 4.27 square miles (11.07 km2) of land and 0.18 square miles (0.47 km2) of water (4.04%).

Unincorporated communities, localities and place names located partially or completely within the township include Ashbrook, Florence Mills, Lenox, Madison Hill and Picton.

The Rahway River Parkway along the Rahway River runs through the township. The Robinson's Branch Reservoir, also known as the Clark Reservoir, is the largest body of water in Union County and bisects the township diagonally.

The township borders Scotch Plains and Westfield on the west, Cranford and Winfield Park on the north, Linden and Rahway on the east, and Edison and Woodbridge Township in Middlesex County on the south.

An abandoned rail spur, the Bloodgood Branch of the Lehigh Valley Railroad, runs through Clark.

Demographics

2010 census

The Census Bureau's 2006–2010 American Community Survey showed that (in 2010 inflation-adjusted dollars) median household income was $80,959 (with a margin of error of +/− $7,674) and the median family income was $99,839 (+/− $7,789). Males had a median income of $65,399 (+/− $3,444) versus $49,649 (+/− $3,780) for females. The per capita income for the township was $37,288 (+/− $2,811). About 2.3% of families and 3.3% of the population were below the poverty line, including 3.3% of those under age 18 and 6.4% of those age 65 or over.

According to the 2009-2013 American Community Survey, the largest ancestry groups were:

  26.9% Italian
  19.8% Irish
  13.1% Polish
  11.9% German
  8.5% American
  6.2% Portuguese
  3.4% Russian
  2.9% English
  2.2% Slovak
  2.1% Spanish
  1.9% Puerto Rican
  1.4% Lithuanian
  1.4% Ukrainian
  1.3% Chinese
  1.3% Cuban
  1.2% Greek
  1.0% Hungarian
  1.0% Colombian
  1.0% Arab

2000 census
As of the 2000 United States census there were 14,597 people, 5,637 households, and 4,126 families residing in the township. The population density was 3,359.6 people per square mile (1,298.6/km2). There were 5,709 housing units at an average density of 1,314.0 per square mile (507.9/km2). The racial makeup of the township was 95.61% White, 0.30% African American, 0.01% Native American, 2.75% Asian, 0.63% from other races, and 0.69% from two or more races. Also Hispanic or Latino of any race were 3.67% of the population.

There were 5,637 households, out of which 28.1% had children under the age of 18 living with them, 61.4% were married couples living together, 9.0% had a female householder with no husband present, and 26.8% were non-families. 24.1% of all households were made up of individuals, and 12.9% had someone living alone who was 65 years of age or older. The average household size was 2.56 and the average family size was 3.07.

In the township the population was spread out, with 20.8% under the age of 18, 5.4% from 18 to 24, 27.6% from 25 to 44, 24.5% from 45 to 64, and 21.7% who were 65 years of age or older. The median age was 43 years. For every 100 females, there were 90.5 males. For every 100 females age 18 and over, there were 86.4 males.

The median income for a household in the township was $65,019, and the median income for a family was $77,291. Males had a median income of $54,543 versus $36,361 for females. The per capita income for the township was $29,883. About 1.0% of families and 1.7% of the population were below the poverty line, including 2.0% of those under age 18 and 2.7% of those age 65 or over.

Government

Local government
Clark Township is governed within the Faulkner Act, formally known as the Optional Municipal Charter Law, under the Mayor-Council system of municipal government, which is governed by a "strong mayor". The township is one of 71 municipalities (of the 564) statewide that use this form of government. The Clark Township Committee is comprised of seven members, who are all chosen on a partisan basis in even-numbered years as part of the November general election. Three members are elected at-large from the township as a whole and four are elected from wards. The three Council-at-large seats and Mayor come up to vote together, and then the four ward seats are up for vote two years later.

, the Mayor of Clark is Republican Salvatore F. "Sal" Bonaccorso, whose term of office ends December 31, 2024. Members of the Township Council are Council President Steven M. Hund (Third Ward; R, 2022), Council Vice President Jimmy Minniti (at-large; R, 2024), Angel Albanese (at-large; R, 2024), Frank G. Mazzarella (First Ward; R, 2022), Patrick O'Connor (Second Ward; R, 2022), Bill Smith (at-large; R, 2024) and Brian P. Toal (Fourth Ward; R, 2022).

Federal, state and county representation
Clark is located in New Jersey's 7th Congressional District, and is part of New Jersey's 22nd state legislative district.

 

Union County is governed by a Board of County Commissioners, whose nine members are elected at-large to three-year terms of office on a staggered basis with three seats coming up for election each year, with an appointed County Manager overseeing the day-to-day operations of the county. At an annual reorganization meeting held in the beginning of January, the board selects a Chair and Vice Chair from among its members. , Union County's County Commissioners are 
Chair Rebecca Williams (D, Plainfield, term as commissioner and as chair ends December 31, 2022), 
Vice Chair Christopher Hudak (D, Linden, term as commissioner ends 2023; term as vice chair ends 2022),
James E. Baker Jr. (D, Rahway, 2024),
Angela R. Garretson (D, Hillside, 2023),
Sergio Granados (D, Elizabeth, 2022),
Bette Jane Kowalski (D, Cranford, 2022), 
Lourdes M. Leon (D, Elizabeth, 2023),
Alexander Mirabella (D, Fanwood, 2024) and 
Kimberly Palmieri-Mouded (D, Westfield, 2024).
Constitutional officers elected on a countywide basis are
County Clerk Joanne Rajoppi (D, Union Township, 2025),
Sheriff Peter Corvelli (D, Kenilworth, 2023) and
Surrogate Susan Dinardo (acting).
The County Manager is Edward Oatman.

Politics
Although Union County as a whole is heavily Democratic, Clark is considered a Republican stronghold. In the 2016 Presidential election, Donald Trump received 5,182 votes (61.7% vs. 30.5% countywide) versus 2,967 for Hillary Clinton (35.3% vs. 65.9% countywide). In 2020, Trump won 5,872 (60.8% vs. 31.5% countywide) versus 3,659 (37.9% vs. 67% countywide) for Joe Biden.

As of March 23, 2011, there were a total of 10,190 registered voters in Clark Township, of which 2,841 (27.9% vs. 41.8% countywide) were registered as Democrats, 2,311 (22.7% vs. 15.3%) were registered as Republicans and 5,036 (49.4% vs. 42.9%) were registered as Unaffiliated. There were 2 voters registered as Libertarians or Greens. Among the township's 2010 Census population, 69.1% (vs. 53.3% in Union County) were registered to vote, including 87.6% of those ages 18 and over (vs. 70.6% countywide).

In the 2012 presidential election, Republican Mitt Romney received 4,538 votes (58.6% vs. 32.3% countywide), ahead of Democrat Barack Obama with 3,041 votes (39.3% vs. 66.0%) and other candidates with 97 votes (1.3% vs. 0.8%), among the 7,741 ballots cast by the township's 10,614 registered voters, for a turnout of 72.9% (vs. 68.8% in Union County). In the 2008 presidential election, Republican John McCain received 5,093 votes (61.5% vs. 35.2% countywide), ahead of Democrat Barack Obama with 3,038 votes (36.7% vs. 63.1%) and other candidates with 85 votes (1.0% vs. 0.9%), among the 8,276 ballots cast by the township's 10,550 registered voters, for a turnout of 78.4% (vs. 74.7% in Union County). In the 2004 presidential election, Republican George W. Bush received 4,819 votes (58.7% vs. 40.3% countywide), ahead of Democrat John Kerry with 3,237 votes (39.4% vs. 58.3%) and other candidates with 80 votes (1.0% vs. 0.7%), among the 8,209 ballots cast by the township's 10,493 registered voters, for a turnout of 78.2% (vs. 72.3% in the whole county).

In the 2013 gubernatorial election, Republican Chris Christie received 67.4% of the vote (3,016 cast), ahead of Democrat Barbara Buono with 31.3% (1,402 votes), and other candidates with 1.3% (60 votes), among the 4,549 ballots cast by the township's 10,438 registered voters (71 ballots were spoiled), for a turnout of 43.6%. In the 2009 gubernatorial election, Republican Chris Christie received 3,375 votes (63.4% vs. 41.7% countywide), ahead of Democrat Jon Corzine with 1,500 votes (28.2% vs. 50.6%), Independent Chris Daggett with 365 votes (6.9% vs. 5.9%) and other candidates with 40 votes (0.8% vs. 0.8%), among the 5,327 ballots cast by the township's 10,302 registered voters, yielding a 51.7% turnout (vs. 46.5% in the county).

Education
The Clark Public School District serves students in pre-kindergarten through twelfth grade. As of the 2019–20 school year, the district, comprised of five schools, had an enrollment of 2,299 students and 184.7 classroom teachers (on an FTE basis), for a student–teacher ratio of 12.4:1. Schools in the district (with 2019–20 enrollment data from the National Center for Education Statistics) are
Clark Preschool with 20 students in Pre-K, 
Frank K. Hehnly Elementary School with 551 students in grades K–5, 
Valley Road Elementary School with 435 students in grades K–5, 
Carl H. Kumpf Middle School with 518 students in grades 6–8 and 
Arthur L. Johnson High School with 708 students in grades 9–12. Students from Garwood attend the district's high school as part of a sending/receiving relationship with the Garwood Public Schools.

Students who excel in middle school have the opportunity to attend the Union County Magnet High School and the other programs of the Union County Vocational Technical Schools, which accept students from across the county on the basis of admissions examinations and applications.

Mother Seton Regional High School is an all-girls, private, Roman Catholic high school, operated under the auspices of the Roman Catholic Archdiocese of Newark. St. John the Apostle School School is a co-ed K–12 school, also operated under the auspices of the same archdiocese. It was dedicated as a National Blue Ribbon school in 2011.

The Clark Scholarship Fund is a not-for-profit organization that has provided need-based scholarships to college-bound Clark residents since 1955, funded entirely by contributions from individuals and businesses.

Transportation

Roads and highways

The Clark Circle connects Central Avenue, Brant Avenue, Valley Road, and at Exit 135 of the Garden State Parkway, which passes through the township. The New Jersey Turnpike Authority redesigned the circle as part of a project that ran from 2007 to 2009 under which the movements at the circle are now controlled by traffic lights. Interchange 135 on the Parkway is signed for Clark / Westfield.

Public transportation
The Lehigh Valley Railroad served Clark with a passenger station in the Picton section. The rail line remains active under Conrail's auspices, excluding the Bloodgood Branch spur which is now out of service.

NJ Transit also provides bus service to New York City and points in-between. The 112 route provides service to the Port Authority Bus Terminal in Midtown Manhattan, as well as stops throughout downtown Elizabeth.

Arts and culture
 The Deutscher Club of Clark was founded in 1935 and is one of the largest German clubs in the US. It offers German food, beer, music and entertainment events to the public.
  The Clark chapter of Unico National, known as Clark Unico, is an Italian American service organization and social club.
  The Polish Cultural Foundation is a nonprofit organization that hosts the Skulski Art Gallery and Polish cultural classes.
  The Clark Recreation Department hosts a summer concert series.

Parks and recreation

  Oak Ridge Park is a county-operated former golf course turned recreational park in Clark.
  The Clark Recreation Department offers a variety of recreational opportunities in town, including the Clark Community Pool.
  The Rahway River Parkway, a greenway of parkland around the Rahway River, snakes through the east side of Clark and includes Bloodgoods Pond, Jackson Pond, and the northernmost portion of Rahway River Park.
 Esposito Park, named a destination park worth traveling for by New Jersey Family magazine, is located near St. Mary's Cemetery.
 Hyatt Hills Golf Complex is a 9-hole golf course in Clark.
 The proposed Clark Reservoir Recreation Area is an area of natural land surrounding the decommissioned Robinson's Branch Reservoir (also known as the Clark Reservoir), which is currently being rehabilitated for recreation.

Notable people

People who were born in, residents of, or otherwise closely associated with Clark include:
 Todd Burger (born 1970), former offensive guard who played for the New York Jets
 Halsey (born 1994), singer
 Kenneth Ham (born 1964), NASA astronaut
 Jeffrey Lichtman (born 1965), defense attorney who represented Joaquin "El Chapo" Guzman and John Gotti Jr.
 William J. Maguire (1916–1997), politician who served as mayor of Clark and in the New Jersey General Assembly from 1976 to 1982
 Ed Pinkham (born 1953), college football coach who is an assistant coach for the Arkansas State Red Wolves
 Matt Poskay (born 1984), professional lacrosse player for the Boston Cannons
 Erik Rosenmeier (born 1965), former NFL center who played for the Buffalo Bills in 1987
 George M. Scott (1922–2006), associate justice of the Minnesota Supreme Court
 Robert Sparks (born 1947), former handball player who competed in the 1972 Summer Olympics and in the 1976 Summer Olympics
 Frank Spaziani (born 1947), former head football coach for Boston College Eagles football
 Kurt Sutter (born 1964), creator of the television show Sons of Anarchy who plays the character Otto Delaney in the show
 Dave Toma (born 1933), whose life in law enforcement was the basis of the television shows Toma and Baretta

References

External links

 Clark Township website
 Clark Public School District
 
 School Data for the Clark Public School District, National Center for Education Statistics
 Clark Public Library
 Clark Fire Department
 Clark P.B.A. Local # 125

 
1864 establishments in New Jersey
Faulkner Act (mayor–council)
Populated places established in 1864
Townships in Union County, New Jersey